Sambhavam is a 1981 Indian Malayalam film, directed by P. Chandrakumar and produced by Babu and Majeendran. The film stars Madhu, Srividya, Adoor Bhasi and Jose Prakash in the lead roles. The film has musical score by V. Dakshinamoorthy.

Cast
 
Madhu 
Srividya
Adoor Bhasi 
Jose Prakash 
Prameela 
Sankaradi 
Cochin Haneefa 
Sukumaran 
Ambika 
Baby Chakki 
K. P. Ummer 
Kunchan 
M. G. Soman 
Mala Aravindan 
Meena 
Ravi Menon 
Seema

Soundtrack
The music was composed by V. Dakshinamoorthy and the lyrics were written by Sathyan Anthikkad.

References

External links
 

1981 films
1980s Malayalam-language films
Films directed by P. Chandrakumar